Heike Gabriela Drechsler (born 16 December 1964) is a German former track and field athlete who represented East Germany and later Germany. One of the most successful long jumpers of all-time, she is a former world record holder and ranks third on the all-time list with her legal best of 7.48 metres in 1988. Her marginally wind-assisted jump of 7.63 metres (+2.1) in 1992 at altitude in Sestriere, is still the furthest a woman has ever long jumped. She is the only woman who has won two Olympic gold medals in the long jump, winning in 1992 and 2000.

Drechsler also won Olympic medals in the 100 metres and 200 metres in 1988, a silver medal in the 100 metres at the 1987 World Championships, and is a former world record holder in the 200 metres with 21.71 secs in 1986.

Biography
Drechsler was born in Gera, Bezirk Gera, East Germany (now Thuringia, Germany). As a teenager she was active in the Free German Youth (FDJ) and in 1984 she was elected to the Volkskammer of East Germany.

Initially a very competitive long jumper early in her career as a teenager, Drechsler made a transition into the world of elite sprinting in 1986 at the age of 21. She married Andreas Drechsler in July 1984 and competed as Heike Drechsler from then on. She was coached by Erich Drechsler, her father-in-law.

In addition to her Olympic success, Drechsler won two World Championships in the long jump (1983 and 1993), as well as gold medals in the long jump and the 200 m sprint in the World Indoor Championships 1987. She also had numerous successes in European and German championships.  Drechsler's greatest rival in the long jump was Jackie Joyner-Kersee, with whom she was also very good friends.

In 1986, Drechsler twice equalled Marita Koch's 200 metres sprint (21.71 seconds) world record and set two long jump world records and equalled one in 1985 and 1986.

According to an article written by Ron Casey (an Australian statistician), in 1986 Drechsler made significant improvements to her 100 m and 200 m times. In one season she went from an 11.75-second 100 m to 10.91 seconds. Her 200 m time improved from 23.19 seconds to 21.71 seconds (equaling the world record) in the 1986 season.

Her 21.71 second performance for 200 m was run into a head wind of −0.8 m/s. By comparison, Marita Koch's 21.71 second runs in 1979 and 1984 had tail winds of +0.7 m/s and +0.3 m/s respectively.

Drechsler's 200 m performance of 21.71 seconds into a head wind (−0.8 m/s) is one of the fastest ever run by a woman in the history of track and field.

In October 1986, she was awarded a Star of People's Friendship in gold (second class) for her sporting success. Several German websites, including her own, claim that Heike Drechsler was voted "Athlete of the Century" in 1999 by the IAAF. This is not quite correct: she was put on the "shortlist", but the award was given to Fanny Blankers-Koen.

Personal records

Long jump
1983:  in Bratislava / (Juniors)
1985:  in East Berlin
1986:  in Tallinn
1988:  in Neubrandenburg
1992:  in Sestriere

Drechsler's 1992 jump in Sestriere was made with a tailwind of 2.1 meters per second, just 0.1 m/s over the allowable level of 2.0 m/s to be considered a world record; it was also performed at an altitude of greater than 1000 meters above sea level, which is the level beyond which marks are designated to have been achieved "at altitude." The jump is 11 cm longer than the current world record.

200 metres
1986: 21.71 seconds in Jena
1986: 21.71 seconds in Stuttgart

Heptathlon
1981: 5891 Points (Junior)
1994: 6741 Points in Talence

Doping allegations
There were many accusations of drug use while she competed for East Germany. She has never failed a drug test during her career; however, all East German athletes competing abroad were tested before departure to avoid getting caught. In 2001, the BBC claimed she has admitted to unknowingly taking prohibited substances in the early 1980s under orders from her team doctors.

In 1991, after the fall of East Germany, Brigitte Berendonk and Werner Franke found several theses and dissertations quoting former GDR doping researchers in the Military Medical Academy Bad Saarow (MMA). The basis of the work reconstructed state-organized doping practices involving many well-known GDR athletes, including Heike Drechsler.  Indications were that Heike Drechsler used high doses of Oral Turinabol plus more testosterone ester injections before competitions from 1982 to 1984.   In 1993, Drechsler challenged Brigitte Berendonk, accusing her of lying in a lawsuit.   In the case, the full annual dosage schedules, and charts of the development of sport performance as a function of the dosage amount, were released. Drechsler lost the lawsuit. However, Drechsler continued to win titles after the DDR time (after 1989), when she started for the merged German team and was tested regularly.

Gallery

See also
 German all-time top lists – 100 metres
 German all-time top lists – 200 metres

References

External links

 Daute-Drechsler rzutyiskoki.pl 
 Home page of Heike Drechsler 
 
 2015 Interview

1964 births
Living people
Sportspeople from Gera
People from Bezirk Gera
Socialist Unity Party of Germany politicians
Members of the 9th Volkskammer
Free German Youth members
East German female long jumpers
East German female sprinters
German female long jumpers
German female sprinters
German heptathletes
Olympic athletes of East Germany
Olympic athletes of Germany
Athletes (track and field) at the 1988 Summer Olympics
Athletes (track and field) at the 1992 Summer Olympics
Athletes (track and field) at the 1996 Summer Olympics
Athletes (track and field) at the 2000 Summer Olympics
World Athletics Championships athletes for East Germany
World Athletics Championships athletes for Germany
People of the Stasi
Female members of the Volkskammer
German sportsperson-politicians
Olympic silver medalists for East Germany
Olympic bronze medalists for East Germany
Olympic gold medalists for Germany
Medalists at the 1988 Summer Olympics
Medalists at the 1992 Summer Olympics
Medalists at the 2000 Summer Olympics
Olympic gold medalists in athletics (track and field)
Olympic silver medalists in athletics (track and field)
Olympic bronze medalists in athletics (track and field)
World Athletics Championships medalists
European Athletics Championships medalists
Goodwill Games medalists in athletics
World record setters in athletics (track and field)
World Athletics indoor record holders
Recipients of the Patriotic Order of Merit in gold
Recipients of the Order of Merit of Baden-Württemberg
Recipients of the Silver Laurel Leaf
Track & Field News Athlete of the Year winners
World Athletics Indoor Championships winners
World Athletics Championships winners
Competitors at the 1986 Goodwill Games
Competitors at the 1994 Goodwill Games
Friendship Games medalists in athletics